Silviu Vitez (born February 7, 1995) is a Romanian-Spanish Muay Thai kickboxer. He is the current WAKO-Pro World K-1 Lightweight champion. As of December 2022, Vitez is ranked the #8 super bantamweight in the world by Beyond Kick.

Career
On December 16, 2017 Vitez faced Mohamed al Mohammadi at Fight Club Slam. He won the fight by decision.

Vitez faced Ryusei Ashizawa in the quarterfinals of the 2018 K-1 featherweight World Grand Prix, held at K-1 World GP 2018: 2nd Featherweight Championship Tournament on June 17, 2018. He lost the fight by a first-round technical knockout.

On October 6, 2018 Vitez defeated Cristian Rodriguez Rojo by knockout in the first round at Enfusion Talents 59.

Vitez faced Moha Salih for the Spanish National Muay Thai -58 kg title at Cinturón Profesional MTR on November 17, 2018. He won the fight by unanimous decision. He made his first title defense against Daniel Botella at MFC Showdown 002 on December 25, 2018. He won the fight by a second-round knockout.

His two fight winning streak was stopped by Brandon Vieira at Divonne Muaythai Challenge 4 on March 16, 2019, who beat him by unanimous decision. Vitez next faced Juan Mario at MFC 003 on May 18, 2019. He lost the fight by unanimous decision.
 
After capturing the ISKA European Muaythai at Noia Fighters 4 on February 8, 2020, with a unanimous decision win over Diogo Silva, Vitez returned to MFC. He notched two unanimous decision victories, over Lusimi Salar on August 1 and Miguel Brito on September 12, 2020, before being booked to face Alex Dass at MFC 012 on June 5, 2021. He won the fight by unanimous decision. Vitez was then booked to face Richi Álvarez at MFC 014: Showdown on September 6, 2021. He won the fight by unanimous decision. 

Vitez faced Fabio Loisi for the vacant WAKO-Pro World K-1 lightweight title at MFC 022 on August 6, 2022. He captured the vacant title by split decision.

Vitez faced the former Arena Fight -60kg champion Djany Fiorenti at Nuit Des Championes 29 on November 19, 2022. He won the fight by decision, after an extra fourth round was contested.

Vitez was booked to face Darren Rolland in the semifinals of the one-day four-man MFC tournament, held at MFC 025 on December 3, 2022. He lost the fight by a second-round technical knockout.

Vitez faced Yodlekpet Or. Pitisak on January 27, 2023, at ONE Friday Fights 2. He lost the fight via technical knockout after the doctor stopped the fight due to a cut.

Vitez faced Saeksan Or. Kwanmuang at ONE Friday Fights 9: Eersel vs. Sinsamut 2 on March 17, 2023. He lost the fight by unanimous decision.

Championships and accomplishments 
World Association of Kickboxing Organizations
2022 WAKO-Pro World K-1 Lightweight (-60 kg) Championship
Muay Thai Grand Prix
2021 MTGP European -61kg Championship
International Sport Karate Association
2019 ISKA Intercontinental Muaythai Featherweight (-57kg) Championship
2020 ISKA European Muaythai Super Featherweight (-59kg) Championship

Fight record

|-  style="text-align:center; background:#fbb"
| 2023-03-17|| Loss ||align=left| Saeksan Or. Kwanmuang ||  ONE Friday Fights 9: Eersel vs. Sinsamut 2 || Bangkok, Thailand || Decision (Unanimous) || 3 || 3:00
|-  style="text-align:center; background:#fbb"
| 2023-01-27|| Loss ||align=left| Yodlekpet Or. Pitisak ||  ONE Friday Fights 2, Lumpinee Stadium || Bangkok, Thailand || 	TKO (Doctor stoppage/cut) || 2 || 2:08	
|-  style="text-align:center; background:#fbb"
| 2022-12-03 || Loss|| align="left" | Darren Rolland || MFC 025, Tournament Semifinal || Ponferrada, Spain|| TKO (Doctor stoppage/cut) || 1 ||3:00 
|-
|-  style="text-align:center; background:#cfc"
| 2022-11-19 || Win || align="left" | Djany Fiorenti || La Nuit Des Champions 29 || Marseille, France || Ext. R. Decision (Unanimous) || 4 || 3:00
|-
|-  style="text-align:center; background:#cfc;"
| 2022-08-06 || Win ||align=left| Fabio Loisi || MFC 022  || Noia, Spain || Decision (Split) || 5 || 3:00
|-
! style=background:white colspan=9 |
|-
|-  style="background:#fbb;"
| 2022-03-19 || Loss || align="left" | Luca Cecchetti || TAF Night || Meda, Italy || Decision || 3 || 3:00
|-
|-  style="background:#cfc;"
| 2022-02-05|| Win || align="left" | Frederico Cordeiro || HMF Custom Fighters || Madrid, Spain|| Decision || 3|| 3:00
|-
|-  style="background:#cfc;"
| 2021-11-13 || Win || align="left" |   || Fight Masters, Final || Acapulco, Mexico || ||  || 

|-  style="background:#cfc;"
| 2021-11-13 || Win || align="left" | Łukasz Kubiak|| Fight Masters, Semi Final || Acapulco, Mexico || ||  || 

|-  style="background:#cfc;"
| 2021-10-10 || Win || align="left" | Simon Robyn || Muay Thai Grand Prix || Paris, France || TKO || 4 || 
|-
! style=background:white colspan=9 |

|-  style="background:#cfc;"
| 2021-09-06 || Win || align="left" | Ricardo Álvarez || MFC 014: Showdown || Ponferrada, Spain || Decision (Unanimous) || 5 || 3:00

|-  style="background:#cfc;"
| 2021-08-21 || Win || align="left" | Diogo Silva || Noia Fighters 4 || Noia, Spain || Decision (Unanimous) || 5 || 3:00
|-
! style=background:white colspan=9 |

|-  style="background:#cfc;"
| 2021-06-05 || Win || align="left" | Alex Dass || MFC 012 || Ponferrada, Spain || Decision (Unanimous) || 5 || 3:00
|-
|-  style="background:#cfc;"
| 2020-09-12 || Win || align="left" | Miguel Brito || MFC 009 || Ponferrada, Spain || Decision (Unanimous) || 3 || 3:00

|-
|-  style="background:#cfc;"
| 2020-08-01 || Win || align="left" | Lusimi Salar || MFC 008 || Ponferrada, Spain || Decision (Unanimous) || 3 || 3:00
|-
|-  style="background:#cfc;"
| 2020-02-08 || Win || align="left" | Nuno Furtado || K1 SLAM Gold Edition 4 || Bilbao, Spain || Decision (Unanimous) || 3 || 3:00

|-  style="background:#fbb;"
| 2019-12-21 || Loss || align="left" | Manu Gómez || MFC 005 || Ponferrada, Spain || Decision  || 3 || 3:00

|-  style="background:#fbb;"
| 2019-09-14|| Loss || align=left| Juan Mario || MFC 003 || Ponferrada, Spain || Decision  || 3 || 3:00

|-  style="background:#cfc;"
| 2019-08-11 || Win || align="left" | Widsanuporn Sor Jor Toipadrew || Max Muay Thai || Pattaya, Thailand || TKO (Punches) || 2 || 1:55 
|-
|-  style="background:#c5d2ea;"
| 2019-07-14 || Draw || align=left| Petchsila Por.Pattara || Max Muaythai || Pattaya, Thailand|| Decision  || 3|| 3:00

|-  style="background:#cfc;"
| 2019-06-22 || Win || align="left" | Jaime Roldan || Lion Fighters XII || Guadalajara, Spain|| Decision || 3 || 3:00 

|-  style="background:#cfc;"
| 2019-04-20 || Win || align="left" | Nick De Blaise || Noia Fighters 3 || Ponferrada, Spain || Decision  || 5 || 3:00
|-
! style=background:white colspan=9 |

|-  style="background:#fbb;"
| 2019-03-16 || Loss || align=left| Brandon Vieira || Divonne Muaythai Challenge 4 || Divonne-les-Bains, France || Decision (Unanimous) || 3 || 3:00
|-
|-  style="background:#cfc;"
| 2018-12-15 || Win || align="left" | Daniel Botella || MFC Showdown 002 || Ponferrada, Spain || KO || 2 || 
|-
! style=background:white colspan=9 |
|-
|-  style="background:#cfc;"
| 2018-11-17 || Win || align="left" | Moha Salih || Cinturón Profesional MTR || Madrid, Spain || Decision (Unanimous) || 3 || 3:00
|-
! style=background:white colspan=9 |

|-  style="background:#cfc;"
| 2018-10-06 || Win || align="left" | Cristian Rodriguez Rojo || Enfusion Talents #59|| Madrid, Spain || TKO (3 Knockdowns)|| 1 || 

|-  style="background:#cfc;"
| 2018-08-26 || Win || align="left" | Boonmark Petchasira || Max Muay Thai || Pattaya, Thailand || Decision || 3 || 3:00 

|-  style="background:#fbb;"
| 2018-06-17 || Loss || align=left| Ryusei Ashizawa || K-1 World GP 2018: 2nd Featherweight Championship Tournament, Quarter Finals || Saitama, Japan || TKO (Ref. Stoppage/Punches) || 1 || 1:28

|-  style="background:#c5d2ea;"
| 2018-02-02 || Draw || align=left| Denkhongchai Dabransarakham || MUAY XTREME || Bangkok, Thailand|| Decision  || 3|| 3:00

|-  style="background:#cfc;"
| 2017-12-16 || Win || align="left" | Mohamed Mohammadi || Fight Club Slam || Leganés, Spain || Decision (Unanimous)|| 5 || 3:00

|-  style="background:#cfc;"
| 2017-10-21 || Win || align="left" | Dennis Lara || Muay Thai Revolution VIII || Madrid, Spain || Decision || 3 || 3:00

|-  style="background:#cfc;"
| 2017-09-30 || Win || align="left" | Hamza Boussalham ||  ||Campo Real, Spain || Decision || 3 || 3:00

|-  style="background:#c5d2ea;"
| 2017-06-30 || Draw|| align="left" | Hamza Boussalham || Boxeo - Muay Thai || Colmenar Viejo, Spain || Decision || 3 || 3:00

|-  style="background:#cfc;"
| 2017-06-10 || Win || align="left" | Antonio Cerdeira || K1 Cieza II Edicion || Cieza, Murcia, Spain || TKO (Doctor stoppage) || 1 || 3:00

|-  style="background:#cfc;"
| 2017-06-03 || Win || align="left" | Jose Antonio || Muay Thai Revolution VII || Madrid, Spain || TKO (Knees) || 1 || 

|-  style="background:#cfc;"
| 2017-03-25 || Win || align="left" | Miguel Angel || Muay Thai Revolution VI || Madrid, Spain || TKO (Referee stoppage) ||1 || 

|-  style="background:#cfc;"
| 2017-01-14 || Win || align="left" | Andrés Leal || Muay Thai Revolution V || Madrid, Spain || Decision (Unanimous) ||4 ||2:00 

|-  style="background:#cfc;"
| 2016-11-26 || Win || align="left" | Adrian Canosa ||  Invencibles VI  || Getafe, Spain || TKO (Doctor stoppage)  || 1 || 1:20 
|-
| colspan=9 | Legend:    

|-  style="background:#cfc;"
| 2016-06-11 || Win || align="left" | Juanra Martin || 1FIGHT - K1 CUP Amateur Series, Final || Madrid, Spain || Decision ||  || 

|-  style="background:#cfc;"
| 2016-06-11 || Win || align="left" | Angel Cabezas || 1FIGHT - K1 CUP Amateur Series, Semi Final || Madrid, Spain || Decision ||  || 
|-
| colspan=9 | Legend:

Mixed martial arts record

|-
|Loss
|align=center|0–1
|Martin Alonso
|KO
|SCC 11: The Challenge
|
|align=center|1
|align=center|
|Tenerife, Spain
|

See also
 List of male kickboxers

References

Living people
1995 births
Romanian male kickboxers
Spanish male kickboxers
Romanian Muay Thai practitioners
People from Câmpia Turzii
Romanian male mixed martial artists
ONE Championship kickboxers